Paul Michael Fink (born December 24, 1950) is an American retired gridiron football player who played in the CFL and NFL for the Edmonton Eskimos and New Orleans Saints. He won the Grey Cup with Edmonton in 1975. He played college football at the University of Missouri and was selected by the Saints in the 9th round of the 1973 NFL Draft.

References

1950 births
Living people
Edmonton Elks players
American football defensive backs
Canadian football defensive backs
American players of Canadian football
Missouri Tigers football players
New Orleans Saints players
Players of American football from Kansas City, Missouri
Players of Canadian football from Kansas City, Missouri